Liberty Movement was a classical liberal political party in Peru.  It was founded in 1987 by people who opposed decrees such as the nationalization of the banking sector in 1986 under the first presidency of Alan García. Instead it advocated a free market approach to solving Peru's hyperinflation, which peaked at over 7000%.

Notable members 
 Pedro Cateriano
 Enrique Chirinos Soto
 Enrique Ghersi
 Beatriz Merino
 Luis Miró Quesada Garland
 Rafael Rey
 Mario Vargas Llosa
 Miguel Vega Alvear
 Ricardo Vega Llona

Electoral history

Presidential elections

Elections to the Congress of the Republic

Elections to the Senate

See also 
 Hernando de Soto
 Lost Decade (Peru)
 Mario Vargas Llosa
 People's Liberty

Bibliography
Tauro del Pino, Alberto: Enciclopedia Ilustrada del Perú. Tercera Edición. Tomo 11. MEN/OJE. Lima, PEISA, 2001. ISBN 9972-40-160-9
Vargas Llosa, Mario: El pez en el agua. Memorias. Editorial Seix Barral, S. A., 1993. ISBN 84-322-0679-2

1987 establishments in Peru
1993 disestablishments in Peru
Classical liberal parties
Defunct liberal political parties
Defunct political parties in Peru
Liberal parties in Peru
Liberal parties in South America
Political parties disestablished in 1993
Political parties established in 1987